The Croatian Academy Football League is the top level of youth football in Croatia. It is contested by academy teams of First League clubs and is organised by the Croatian Football Federation.

Since its inception in 1991, and with the exception of 2014–15 when U19 league was not played, the youth league has been contested in two age categories and from 2014-15 three age categories:
Under-19s (Prva HNL za Juniore)
Under-17s (Prva HNL za Kadete)
Under-15s (Prva HNL za Pionire)

Past winners

By season

Championship canceled due to COVID-19

By titles

Under 19
 10 wins Dinamo Zagreb U19
 7 wins Hajduk Split U19
 3 wins Osijek U19, Rijeka U19, Varteks U19
 1 win Lokomotiva U19, NK Zagreb U19

Under 17
 18 wins Dinamo Zagreb U17 (including two titles as "HAŠK Građanski" and "Croatia Zagreb")
 7 wins Hajduk Split U17
 2 wins Osijek U17
 1 win Varteks U17, NK Zagreb U17

Under 15
 11 wins Dinamo Zagreb U15
 4 wins Hajduk Split U15
 3 wins Osijek U15
 2 wins NK Zagreb U15
 1 win Istra U15, Lokomotiva U15, Varteks U15

Top scorers

References

External links
Official website (U19) 
Official website (U17) 
Official website (U15) 

Prva
1991 establishments in Croatia
 
Academy
Sports leagues established in 1991